Pindray is a commune in the Vienne department in the Nouvelle-Aquitaine region in western France.

The town has a mayor. From March 2001 it was Jean-Marie Robin and in 2006 he was succeeded by Francis Servat who served until 2014.

The Chateau of Pruniers was built in the 19th century. Its dovecot and roof have been listed buildings since 1973.

See also
Communes of the Vienne department

References

Communes of Vienne